Ravi Bissambhar, also known as Ravi B, (born October 27, 1982) is a Trinidadian chutney musician.

Personal life
Ravi Bissambhar, born to a musical family in Sangre Grande but currently lives Cunupia, Trinidad and Tobago, attended the Sangre Grande Hindu school, North Eastern College, University of the West Indies. His parents are of Bhojpuri Indian descent. Ravi started his singing career at the age of 13. At the age of 25 he was already the lead vocalist, music director, producer and arranger for his band Karma which was founded by him together with his brother Anil Bissambhar and his sister Nisha Bissambhar. He is also a radio personality with Trinidad and Tobago's Indian radio station, 90.5fm. 

Ravi B's love for music and singing took him to several countries. He is considered one of the most talented and hard working artistes in his arena. He is one of the very few artistes from the Caribbean that can perform and sing Chutney Soca, Bollywood playback, Soca, Reggae, Bhajans and Classical Indian singing. Ravi B is a Hindu born child and still practices his traditions.

Karma
Bissambhar is the lead male vocalist, music director, producer, and arranger for the Caribbean-fused band Karma.

Inspiration
Ravi Bissambhar says he is inspired by international artists like Kumar Sanu, Sonu Nigam, Eminem and Machel Montano, but what inspires him the most is his parents, his brother Anil, sisters Nalini and Nisha, his love for music and most importantly God. Ravi has toured the Caribbean, U.S.A., Canada, Guyana, Europe and Suriname; representing Trinidad's culture, chutney and soca. He was nominated for Best Chutney Soca artiste at the Virgin Records Awards in March 2006. Bissambhar was also a finalist in the Mastana Bahar and Chutney Soca Monarch competition.

Achievements
Some of his greatest achievements includes being the first Chutney Soca artiste to cross a million views on YouTube with his track ‘Drinka’ and is still the first Chutney Soca artiste to trend on Twitter on the night of 2013 Groovy Soca Monarch when he performed his title ‘Prescription’ which placed him fourth being defeated by the best of Soca, Machel Montano, Iwer George and Blaxxx. Ravi B is also the first artiste to cross 100000 fans on Facebook. He performed alongside Nitin Mukesh in 1996, Shah Rukh Khan in 1999, formed Karma in 2003 together with his Father, Brother, and Sister (“Jeewanlal, Anil, and Nisha Bissambhar”), got hired by radio channel 90.5 FM in 2002, performed with Kumar Sanu at the 90.5 FM cook out competition in 2004, was chosen to open the Bollywood Music Awards 2005, the Bollywood Movie Awards 2006, received Best Sounding Band at Unifest 2006 in Miami, having his own concert for Father's day annually and singing with Babul Supriyo on the same stage at Zen Trinidad.

Ravi B has produced 12 Albums which Includes Karma Evolution, A.B.C.party mix, Secret 48, Karma Mangalam, Destiny 1,2,3, Karmasutra, Karmasutra 2.0., Karmageddon, Secret 69 and Bread The Album.

Ravi B was the only artiste chosen to perform at the launch of the ScotiaBank Toronto Carnival 2013 (Caribana), he was also featured on National TV on CP24 News!

In 2014, Ravi B collaborated with Machel Montano and MahaLaxmi Iyer on Ravi's hit track Breakaway to become the biggest collaboration in Chutney and Soca. Ravi also collaborated with Kerwin Du Bois in 2015 on their monster track ‘Over Doing It’ Collaborated with Konshens in 2013, with Alison hinds and Nadia Batson in 2015 and with Kes in 2009 for the monster track ‘JepSting’

2017 csm winner song Budget

Awards
Karma recently copped the Best Chutney Soca band of the year, Best Male Chutney Soca Artiste and Chutney Song of the year at the 2015 International Soca Awards in New York City.

He was also voted the Best New Artiste in the year 2003 and he received the award for Best Bhajan album in 2005 following numerous awards over the years, his recent being Chutney male Artiste of the year 2015, best Chutney Soca Song of 2015 and Chutney band of the year 2010 to 2015 at the International Soca Awards 2015 that took place in New York City. He was also nominated for Best Chutney Soca artiste at the International Reggae Awards 2015 in October. Ravi was also a finalist in the Mastana Bahar and Chutney Soca Monarch competition in 2010 becoming the youngest person to have ever won the CSM Title. He was also the Chutney Soca Monarch (CSM) 2015 and Traditional Chutney Soca Monarch(TCM) 2015, three titles that again makes him the youngest to hold three titles.

Ravi B also placed first in the Chutneymusic.com Top 10 and Top 100 several times.

Albums and hit songs
Another Bad Creation (2003)
Secret 48 (2004)
Karma Mangalam (Bhajan CD) (2005)
Karma Sutra (2005)
Destiny 1 (2005)

Destiny 2 (2006)
Rum is Meh Lover
Destiny 3 (2007)
Whine On Meh Ta La La La
Karma Sutra 2.0 (2008)
Barahee
Bison
Parbatee

Karmageddon (2009)
Jep Sting Naina
Tell Where Yuh From
Tek Meh Gyul
Dularie Nanny
Secret 69 (2013)
Gyal Wukkin
Prescription
Wine Up Your Body
Keep Working – Gregory Ayuen
Choli Ke Peeche – Nisha B & Ravi B
Karma Slam 4 – Ravi B
Jiya Re – Nilli B & Nisha B
Karma Heer – Nisha B & Ravi B
Sanam Teri Kasam – Ravi B & Anil Bheem
Friends With Benefits – Ravi B & Konshens
Gul Doh Bother Me – Ravi B
Bacchanal – Omadath Maharaj & Ravi B
Gul Doh Bother Me – Ravi B
Lawa – Ravi B & Iwer George
Sindoor Lagawe – Nisha B
Tassa – Gregory Ayuen
License To Wine – Ravi B
Budget - Ravi B (2017)
Start Over - Ravi B (2018) 
Gunga Ghana - Dubraj Persad & Ravi B (2019) 
Headshot - Ravi B (2019) 
Deal With Dat - Ravi B (2020)

Collaborations
"Jep Sting Naina"
"Bhaigan & Aloo" – Lalchan Babwa(Hunter), Ravi Bissambhar, Anil Bheem, Neeshan Prabhoo, Drupatee Ramgoonai, Andy Singh
"Tek Me Gyal" – Ravi Bissambhar, ft Neeshan Prabhoo
"De Hammer" – Ravi Bissambhar ft. S.W. Storm
"Ah Drinka" – Ravi Bissambhar & Johnny Fontainne
"Vanni" – Ravi Bissambhar & Shiva Lakhan
"Player" – Ravi Bissamber
"Cya Cum" – Ravi Bissambhar
"Sumatee" – Ravi Bissambhar & Terry Gajraj
"Ah Rose" – Ravi Bisshambhar
"Single" – Ravi Bissambhar & Rick Ramoutar
"She Horning Meh" – Ravi Bissambhar
"Doh Wah Me Go" – Ravi Bissambhar
"De Limer, Drinka & Barman" – Ravi Bissambhar, Dollyboy & Rikki Jai
"Lawa" – Ravi Bissambhar & Iwer George
"Doh Go Away" – Ravi Bissambhar & Rick Ramoutar
"Prescription" – Ravi Bissambhar
"Bacchanal" – Ravi Bissambhar & Omardath Maharaj
"Friends With Benefits" – Ravi Bissambhar & Konshens
"All Out Of Rum" – Ravi Bissambhar, Hunter, Rikki Jai & Soca Elvis
"Gyal Wukkin" – Ravi Bissambhar

References

Living people
1982 births
University of the West Indies alumni
Trinidad and Tobago Hindus
Chutney musicians
Trinidad and Tobago people of Indian descent